KNBR (680 kHz) is a San Francisco, California AM radio station, broadcasting on a clear channel from transmitting facilities in Redwood City, California. KNBR's non-directional 50,000-watt class-A signal can be heard throughout much of the western United States and as far west as the Hawaiian Islands at night. For several decades, KNBR enjoyed a long history as the flagship station of NBC's West Coast radio operations.

Two other stations also use the KNBR brand. KNBR-FM (104.5 FM) in San Francisco has been a full-time simulcast of KNBR's programming since September 6, 2019. KTCT (1050 kHz) is licensed to San Mateo, California, with a transmitter located near Hayward, California. It carried a separate sports format known as The Ticket but was rebranded as a second KNBR in 2003. The Sports Leader is the on-air branding used by all three stations. The stations' studios are located at 750 Battery Street in San Francisco's Financial District.

Between the three stations, games of the San Francisco Giants, San Francisco 49ers, Bay Area Panthers and Stanford Cardinal are broadcast to the San Francisco Bay Area. KTCT was available in the HD format on 1050 kHz but has been broadcasting in analog. In addition, KNBR was simulcast on the HD2 subchannel of KSAN in nearby San Mateo.

History

KNBR began broadcasting on April 17, 1922, as KPO, a 100-watt station owned by the Hale Brothers department store. In 1925, the San Francisco Chronicle newspaper bought half-interest in the operation. Originally located in the department store at 901 Market between 5th and 6th, its horizontal wire antenna on the roof was so efficient, it immediately attracted the attention of audiences all over the Pacific Coast.

In 1927, KPO became an affiliate of the new NBC radio network. In 1933, KPO was sold to NBC's parent company, the Radio Corporation of America (RCA), and its operation was consolidated into that of its co-owned KGO at the Hunter-Dulin Building, 111 Sutter Street. From there, NBC operated its West Coast network, feeding dozens of stations and operating a news bureau to serve NBC. As NBC's flagship station on the West Coast, it had a full-time orchestra, five studios, and produced many live shows. During the rise of Hollywood, NBC's radio operation was moved to Los Angeles.

In 1941, just before World War II, NBC constructed Radio City at 420 Taylor Street, considered one of the best radio facilities built during radio's golden age. However, with the network control having been moved to Los Angeles, the San Francisco NBC building was never fully utilized. (Later, the building housed KBHK-TV and has since housed the headquarters of Reddit and Nextdoor.)

During World War II, KPO's news bureau was the major source of NBC of news about the war in the Pacific, and operated shortwave radio stations (transmitters located in Dixon) serving the world. It was at the KPO (RCA) shortwave facility that the message was received that Japanese emperor Hirohito had surrendered, ending World War II.

On November 23, 1947, NBC changed KPO's call sign to KNBC, to strengthen its identity as an NBC station (and the only radio station NBC ever owned on the West Coast). This change lasted until fifteen years later, when the network decided to move the KNBC identity to its television station in Los Angeles. NBC had asked the FCC to restore the KPO call letters to the San Francisco radio station but later withdrew that request and 680 AM was renamed KNBR on November 11, 1962.

In November 1949, NBC television affiliate KRON-TV went on the air. Only before the TV station's first airdate did NBC fight for the construction permit for the TV station until it lost the bid to the de Young family, then the owners of the San Francisco Chronicle.

In the 1950s when NBC scrapped its radio comedy, drama, variety shows, and serials, the Los Angeles facility was sold and demolished, and KNBC/KNBR once again became the West Coast NBC network control center and West Coast NBC Radio news operation.

KNBR evolved into a Middle of the road music format mixing in Adult Standards with Soft Rock cuts by the early 1960s. The station continued to be a news-intensive format with personalities in the foreground and music in the background. Personalities included Frank Dill, Mike Cleary, Les Williams, Dave Niles, and Jack Hayes. Until January 1975, KNBR carried NBC's long-running weekend show, Monitor. By the mid-1970s, KNBR evolved musically into a straight-ahead adult contemporary music format and continued as such into the 1980s.

Bill Dwyer became GM in the mid 1970s and brought Allan Hotlen as Program Director in the mid 1970s and was followed in that job by Ron Reynolds. When Ron Reynolds moved to NBC's San Francisco FM outlet (KYUU became the FM call letters then), Scott Burton came to KNBR as Program Director.    Ron Lyons, C.J. Bronson and Tom Brown became part of the on-air personality staff during the mid 1970s.

In 1979, KNBR was awarded the Billboard Magazine Adult Contemporary Station of The Year under GM Bill Dwyer. Scott Burton was Program Director and Bryan Eaton  Music Director.  Other members of the management team included Isabel Lemon (Promotions) and Jane Morrison and Gimmy Park Li (Community Affairs)

In March 1989 NBC sold KNBR to Susquehanna Radio Corporation; it was the last radio property held by NBC, which two years earlier made the decision to sell off its radio division following General Electric's 1986 acquisition of RCA. The station soon added some sports talk in evenings, and took a full-time sports format in 1990 with the lone exception of The Rush Limbaugh Show, which KNBR carried from 1988 until 2000.

KNBR is a former primary station of the Bay Area's Emergency Broadcast System. KNBR lost the designated primary EBS opportunity in 1990 after a major technical malfunction caused by KNBR's engineering department during the 1989 Loma Prieta earthquake. The Federal Communications Commission investigated the issue that the EBS designation was "revoked". This made the primary EBS station move to KCBS.

KNBR carried programs from ESPN Radio and KTCT aired shows from both ESPN Radio and Fox Sports Radio until 2013 when both stations switched to the Cumulus-distributed CBS Sports Radio.

In 2015, KNBR's studios were relocated from 55 Hawthorne Street to 750 Battery Street after parent Cumulus Media consolidated its San Francisco radio stations in one building.

In June 2018, KNBR began broadcasting in HD Radio on KSAN's HD2 channel.

KNBR added an FM simulcast on 104.5 on September 6, 2019, and became KNBR-FM.

Ownership
KNBR and KTCT are owned by Cumulus Media Partners, LLC, a private partnership of Cumulus Media, Bain Capital, The Blackstone Group, and Thomas H. Lee Partners. It was purchased from Susquehanna-Pfaltzgraff Media in 2005 along with other Susquehanna Radio Corporation stations.

Sports content

KNBR has been the radio home of the San Francisco Giants since 1979 (taking over from KSFO). Play-by-play is done by Jon Miller and Dave Flemming. Miller and Flemming are frequently joined by Giants television broadcasters Mike Krukow and Duane Kuiper.  The four announcers often share radio and TV broadcasting duties during a game. Marty Lurie continues to host the Giants pre-game show on weekends.

Tim Roye was the radio play-by-play announcer for the Golden State Warriors, and was occasionally joined by Jim Barnett on non-televised games as Barnett serves as an analyst for TV broadcasts. On August 25, 2016, the Warriors announced they have ended their partnership with KNBR and signed with KGMZ-FM. The partnership with KNBR lasted 40 years, including 32 consecutive years.

The station has long been a home for arena and indoor football. A vast array of announcers participated in San Jose SaberCats broadcasts, including Tim Roye, Bob Fitzgerald, Ray Woodson, Keena Turner, George Atkinson, and Troy Clardy. In 2020, KNBR via KTCT began to broadcast games of the Bay Area Panthers. Scott Reiss is the voice of the Panthers.

In 2005, KNBR became the official radio home of the San Francisco 49ers. All games are also heard on sister station KSAN; some AM broadcasts may be moved to KTCT due to conflicts with Giants games. 49ers games were broadcast by Joe Starkey and Gary Plummer for four seasons until Starkey's retirement following the 2008 season. In the 2009 season, former Giants baseball and world-class tennis announcer Ted Robinson took over for Starkey as the play-by-play announcer. Greg Papa and Tim Ryan currently call 49er games on KNBR.

KNBR and KTCT are charter affiliates of CBS Sports Radio, a joint venture between CBS Radio and Cumulus, which started on January 2, 2013. NBC Sports Radio is also carried on KTCT.

Programming
On KNBR, weekday programming consists of the following blocks, which are preempted or moved to KTCT when there are regularly scheduled sports events. The morning shows include Murph and Mac (Brian Murphy and Paul McCaffrey) Papa and Lund (Greg Papa and John Lund). The afternoon show is Tolbert, Krueger and Brooks (Tom Tolbert, Larry Krueger, and Rod Brooks). Evening and late-night shows include The Mark Willard Show 

Late night programming is usually filled in by hosts featured on CBS Sports Radio. Weekend programs include Commonwealth Club, Hooked on Golf, Protect Your Assets with David Hollander, Sports Saloon, At the Track, Gary Allen on Business, and assorted CBS Sports Radio programming.

On KTCT, weekday programming consists of the following blocks when not preempted by sports events. The morning shows have CBS Sports Radio with Barber, Tierney, Jacobsen; The John Feinstein Show, and The Jim Rome Show. The afternoon show is hosted by Ted Ramey and then The Tom Tolbert Show is simulcast with KNBR 680. The evening shows have Scott Ferrall's show Ferrall on the Bench, followed by late-night programming from CBS Sports Radio and then NBC Sports Radio. Weekend programs include Mortgage Makeover and various CBS Sports and NBC Sports Radio programming. Commonwealth Club is presented early Sunday mornings.

Framing the various San Francisco Giants events, Marty Lurie fills in as a host of SportsPhone 680 Giants Warm-Up shows on KNBR every weekend during the baseball season.

Former hosts and personalities

 Ralph Barbieri
 Rick Barry
 C.J. Bronson
 Damon Bruce
 Mike Cleary
 Peter B. Collins
 Ryan Covay
 Frank Dill
 Ken Dito
 Scott Ferrall
 Pete Franklin
 Bob Fitzgerald
 Kevin Frandsen
 Hank Greenwald
 Steve Jamison
 Leo Laporte
 Bob Lazich
 John London
 Steve McPartlin
 Dave Newhouse
 Kevin Radich 
 Gary Radnich
 Ray Ratto
 Tim Roye
 F. P. Santangelo
 Kate Scott
 Carter B. Smith
 Joel A. Spivak
 Mychael Urban 
 Jan Wahl
 Kim Wonderley

Former syndicated shows
 Costas Coast to Coast (syndicated, hosted by Bob Costas)
 The Rush Limbaugh Show (syndicated)
 Instant Replay (syndicated, hosted by Pat Summerall); later Pat Summerall's Sports in America The Extreme Scene (later syndicated)
 Cyrus Saatsaz (host)
 Steve Blankenship (host)
 Omar Etcheverry (host)
 SportsPhone 680 with other hosts
 SportsPhone 680 was formerly hosted by Larry Krueger, who was fired after a personal rant against the Giants on the show. During his rant, he criticized the Giants for brain-dead Caribbean hitters hacking at slop nightly. Krueger was first suspended for 10 days, then, on August 10, 2005, KNBR announced that it had ceased professional relations with Krueger. Damon Bruce took over the show in October 2005 and hosted until February 26, 2010, when he started his own noon–4 pm show on KNBR. FP Santangelo took over as SportsPhone680 host. His show lasted from March 1, 2010, to January 19, 2011, after the Washington Nationals hired him as their color commentator for MASN. Eric Byrnes took over as SportsPhone680 host, and hosted his first show on March 23, 2011. In May 2012 when Ralph Barbieri was fired by KNBR, Byrnes agreed to co-host with Tom Tolbert until they found a permanent co-host. Byrnes still hosted SportsPhone680 on days where the Giants played day games. He did his last show in July 2012 and Ray Woodson, who's filled in on SportsPhone680 many times and was formerly a sidekick on the Gary Radnich show, officially took over as host.
 Untitled (Public Affairs)Originating as part of the station's statutory requirement of public affairs programming, the station now airs an hour-long interview show Saturday mornings at 5 am.

During the 1990s, the program typically began and ended with the phrase This is Gimmy Park Li, your host. No program title was given. Interviews for this program often consisted of local individuals in volunteer, charitable, or minor governmental capacities.

Due to its time slot, the program is the quintessential example of the Sunday morning public affairs ghetto. The program has never been promoted outside of its timeslot. Gimmy Park Li was the station's public affairs director. Her signature was her sign off: This is Gimmy Park Li, your host. Thank you for spending your time ... with us.''

References

External links
FCC History Cards for KNBR 
 
Official Extreme Scene Sports Radio Website
The History of KPO (KNBR)
The History of KPO Radio San Francisco

Sports radio stations in the United States
NBR
Sports in San Francisco
Radio stations established in 1922
NBC Radio Network affiliates
1922 establishments in California
CBS Sports Radio stations
Sports in the San Francisco Bay Area
Cumulus Media radio stations
Former General Electric subsidiaries
Clear-channel radio stations
Radio stations licensed before 1923 and still broadcasting